Rożnowice  (before 1947 Rozembarg) is a village in the administrative district of Gmina Biecz, within Gorlice County, Lesser Poland Voivodeship, in southern Poland.

The village has a population of 1,436.

References

Villages in Gorlice County